The Kingston upon Hull North by-election of 27 January 1966 was held after the death of Labour Member of Parliament (MP) Henry Solomons on 7 November 1965. The seat was retained with an increased majority by Kevin McNamara of the Labour Party. This has been attributed to the announcement of the construction of the Humber Bridge by the government during the campaign.

Previous general election result

Results

Aftermath
Harold Wilson's Labour Party formed a government after winning a majority of four seats at the 1964 general election. Shortly after this by-election, Wilson called a general election for 31 March. Wilson's hope that he would be returned to office with a larger majority had been encouraged by the government's victory at the Kingston upon Hull North by-election. In the end, Wilson's decision was vindicated, as Labour was returned with a larger majority of 96 seats.

References

Further reading 

 Sophie Roberts, "The campaign of the 'red-bearded radical': Richard Gott and the Hull North by-election, 1966", Contemporary British History, vol. 32, issue 3 (2018), pp. 336–358.

External links
Full result
Election literature for Radical Alliance

1966 elections in the United Kingdom
By-elections to the Parliament of the United Kingdom in Yorkshire and the Humber constituencies
Elections in Kingston upon Hull
1960s in the East Riding of Yorkshire
1966 English local elections
20th century in Kingston upon Hull